Cillian Damien Murphy (born 6 July 1985) is an Irish actor, better known professionally as Killian Scott. He first came to prominence for his role as Tommy in the RTÉ One series Love/Hate.

Early life 
The youngest of six children, Scott grew up in Sandymount, Dublin, and attended St Michael's College on Ailesbury Road in Dublin 4. His siblings include former politician Eoghan Murphy and playwright Colin Murphy. His interest in acting was inspired by his brother Eoghan's performance in a school production of Hamlet. He studied English and Philosophy at University College Dublin before moving to London to study at the Drama Centre.

Career 
Initially starting out in theatre, he changed his name to Killian Scott to avoid confusion with Cillian Murphy, another Irish actor. He earned fame in Ireland for the role of Tommy in Love/Hate, which first started airing in 2010. During the next few years, Scott appeared in small roles in films including '71 and Calvary, as well as starring in 2013's Black Ice.

After Love/Hate finished, Scott appeared in his first lead role in Irish thriller film Traders in 2015. Scott joined Ripper Street for series four and five in 2016, portraying Assistant Commissioner Augustus Dove. The same year, he appeared in Trespass Against Us. In 2017, he appeared in Strike as D.I. Eric Wardle. The same year, he was cast as the lead in Damnation, replacing Aden Young, who departed the show due to creative differences. Due to Young's departure, Scott filmed the pilot episode within a week of being cast in late 2016. The series was picked up by USA Network in June 2017, with filming beginning the following month. Damnation was cancelled after its first season ended in January 2018. He starred in The Commuter with Liam Neeson in 2018, and described the film as a "genuine career highlight".

In 2019, Scott starred alongside Sarah Greene in Dublin Murders, based on the Dublin Murder Squad book series by Tana French. He portrays lead character Detective Rob Reilly and adopted an English accent for the role. The series was filmed in Belfast and Dublin over seven months.

In April 2021, Scott was cast in the upcoming Disney+ superhero streaming series Secret Invasion, set in the Marvel Cinematic Universe.

Filmography

Film

Television

References

External links 

Living people
1985 births
21st-century Irish male actors
Alumni of University College Dublin
Irish male film actors
Irish male television actors
Male actors from Limerick (city)
People educated at St Michael's College, Dublin
Male actors from Dublin (city)